is a passenger railway station located in the city of Tokorozawa, Saitama, Japan, operated by East Japan Railway Company (JR East).

Lines
It is located 15.7 kilometers from Fuchūhommachi Station.

Station layout
The station consists of two island platforms serving four tracks, located one level below ground level, with the station building above. To the east of the station lies Higashi-Tokorozawa Depot, which has 20 storage tracks.

The station has a Midori no Madoguchi staffed ticket office.

Platforms

History
The station opened on 1 April 1973.

Passenger statistics
In fiscal 2019, the station was used by an average of 15,088 passengers daily (boarding passengers only).

The passenger figures for previous years are as shown below.

Surrounding area
 Shukutoku University Mizuhodai Campus
 Higashi-Tokorozawa Park
 Higashi-Tokorozawa Depot (JR East)
 Tokorozawa Sakura Town

See also
 List of railway stations in Japan

References

External links

 Higashi-Tokorozawa Station information (JR East) 
 Higashi-Tokorozawa Station information (Saitama Prefectural Government) 

Railway stations in Saitama Prefecture
Railway stations in Japan opened in 1973
Stations of East Japan Railway Company
Railway stations in Tokorozawa, Saitama
Musashino Line